Piz Scalotta is a mountain of the Oberhalbstein Alps, located west of Bivio in the canton of Graubünden. It lies north of Piz Surparé.

References

External links
 Piz Scalotta on Hikr

Mountains of Graubünden
Mountains of the Alps
Mountains of Switzerland
Two-thousanders of Switzerland
Surses